Allen Moore Boren (1934 – November 14, 2018) was an American football player and coach.  He served as the head football coach at Sam Houston State University from 1972 to 1973, compiling a record of 7–14.

Boren played football, baseball, track, and basketball at Carthage High School and later football and baseball at Sam Houston State University for coach Paul Pierce.  After graduation, he started his coaching career as an assistant at Wharton High School in 1956, before moving on to Sweeny High School. In 1959, Boren landed his first head coaching job at Bellville High School, a Class 2A school between Houston and Austin, Texas. Two district titles, one Bi-Dist. and one state runner up 37-9-1. Later he also coached at Edna High School. Two Dist titles and one state runner up. 44-21 and Humble High School. One district title 18-13. In 1972, Boren left Humble to succeed Tom Page as head coach at his alma mater. After two losing seasons, 5–6 in 1972 and 2–8 in 1973, Boren resigned to become Director of Athletics in the Klein School Dist. in north Harris County.  During his 17 years in Klein, the district grew from one 4A high school to three 5A high schools (Klein, Klein Forest and Klein Collins) and the number of coaches grew from 23 to 126.  Boren retired in 1991.  He is a member of the following Halls of Honor:  The Texas High School Coaches, Texas High School Athletic Directors, Sam Houston State Bearkat and Bellville High School Brahma.

Head coaching record

College

Further reading

References

Date of birth unknown
1934 births
2018 deaths
American football quarterbacks
Sam Houston Bearkats football coaches
Sam Houston Bearkats football players
High school football coaches in Texas
People from Carthage, Texas
Players of American football from Texas